

Qiushi Academy - Zhejiang Advanced College period

National 3rd Sun Yat-sen University - National Chekiang University period 
Chekiang University or National Chekiang University is also known as the University of Chekiang. Chekiang is the same as Zhejiang.

Zhejiang University (dissociated) period

Zhejiang University presidents

Zhejiang Normal College - Hangzhou University presidents

Zhejiang Agricultural College / University presidents

Zhejiang Medical College / University presidents

Zhejiang University (reunified) period

Presidents of other roots 
In history, several schools (either their students, faculties or whole campus) were merged into Zhejiang University. And their presidents in history are listed out below:

Yingshi University presidents 
See Yingshi University.
 Wu Nanxuan (吳南軒/吴南轩)
 Du Zuozhou (杜佐周)
 He Bingsong (何炳松)
 Zhou Shang (周尚)
 Yang Gongda (楊公達/杨公达)
 Tang Jihe (湯吉禾/汤吉禾)
 Deng Chuankai (鄧傳楷/邓传楷)

Zhejiang Provincial College of Medicine presidents 
See Zhejiang Provincial College of Medicine.

List of Presidents from 1911 to 1951:
 HAN Qingquan (韩清泉)
 ZHU Qihui (朱其辉)
 DING Qiuzhen (丁求真)
 SHENG Zaixing (盛在珩)
 LI Bao (李宝)
 WU Cui (吴粹)
 CHENG Hao (程浩)
 WANG Ji (王佶)
 CHEN Zongtang (陈宗棠)
 JIANG Kun (蒋鵾)

Hangchow University presidents 
See Hangchow University or Hangchow University Historic Site.
 Rev, J. H. Judson (裘德生); American citizen
 E.J. Mattox (王令赓) 1914–1916; American citizen
 Warren H. Stuart (司徒华林) 1916–1922; American citizen, young brother of John L. Stuart
 Robert F. Fitch (1873–1954; 费佩德) 1922–1931; American citizen
 Baen E. Lee (李培恩) 1931–1949; American citizen
 Li Zhaohuan (黎照寰)

References

External links 
 浙江大学历任校长一览

History of Zhejiang University
People associated with Zhejiang University
Zhejiang